Lumbini Province is a province in western Nepal. The third largest province by area and the third largest by population, Lumbini province is home to the World Heritage Site of Lumbini, where according to the Buddhist tradition, the founder of Buddhism, Gautama Buddha was born. 

Lumbini borders Gandaki Province and Karnali Province to the north, Sudurpashchim Province to the west, Uttar Pradesh and Bihar of India to the south. Lumbini's capital, Deukhuri, is near the geographic center of the province; it is a small town which is currently being developed to meet the prerequisite of provincial capital. The major cities in this province are Butwal and Siddharthanagar in Rupandehi District, Nepalgunj in Banke District, Tansen in Palpa District, and Ghorahi and Tulsipur in Dang District.

Etymology 
Lumbini Province is named after the holy pilgrimage site of Lumbini in the Rupandehi District, birthplace of Gautama Buddha – the founder of Buddhism. The Provincial Assembly adopted Lumbini Province as the permanent name by replacing its initial name Province No. 5 on 6 October 2020 and Deukhuri was declared the state capital of the province.

History

Pre-history 
The Churiya range linked with the Dang valley of Lumbini province has been archaeologically considered very ancient with the existence of Sivapithecus, a link between man and ape. The pre-historic studies of the valley have been carried out extensively since the last century; by Tribhuvan University since 1966, American Museum of Natural History and the Department of Mines of then His Majesty's Government of Nepal from 1976, as well as the paleolithic study of Dang valley by University of Erlangen-Nuremberg of Germany in 1984, among others. These researches have pointed out that Dang valley was a lake approximately 2.5 to 1 million years ago. In addition, Hand axes and other artefacts dated to early Paleolithic (1.8 million to 100,000 years ago) have been found in alluvial deposits along the Babai River in Dang Valley, which have been classified as Acheulean or second-generation tools that succeed the oldest Olduwan. Also along the Babai River, there have been discoveries of archeological sites dated to Upper Paleolithic/Late Pleistocene (about 50,000 to 10,000 years ago).

Shakya-era 
As per the Buddhist tradition, Queen Maya Devi of Kapilavastu was traveling to her father's Koliya kingdom in Devdaha to give birth to her child as was the Shakya tradition. However, on the way she stopped near the garden of Lumbini to rest and went into labour thus giving birth to the future Buddha under a sal tree. Gautama Buddha was born in 623 BC in Lumbini, testified by the inscription on the pillar erected by the Mauryan Emperor Ashoka in 249 BC which marks the spot as the birthplace of Buddha Shakyamuni. The inscription mentions, as translated by Paranavitana:

According to the Buddhist texts, Gautama Buddha was born as a prince in a royal Shakya clan reigning over the kingdom of Kapilavastu. This ancient city has been widely identified as Tilaurakot of present Kapilvastu district where ruins of the ancient fortified city have been found. Gautama was a prince of Kapilavastu until the age of 29, after which he left the palace behind and wandered throughout the Ganges plain as an ascetic – learning yoga and related concepts from various teachers. Gautama became the Buddha or the Enlightened One after several years of his wandering, one day under the Bodhi tree in Bodh Gaya. After enlightenment, he began his teachings and travelled extensively throughout the Ganges plain. The original teachings of Buddha later culminated into Buddhism, spreading through much of Asia then and the world at present.

After the death of Gautama Buddha, eight princes out of sixteen mahājanapadās received Buddha's relics, one of them a Koliyan king of Rāmagrāma (present Parasi district) who built a stupa enshrining the relic. Buddhist texts point out the princes constructed a stupa at or near their capital city and enshrined Buddha's relics. The site has the only undisturbed original stupa containing the relic of Gautama Buddha in the world, and was added to the World Heritage Tentative List by UNESCO on 23 May 1996.

Reign of Ashoka the Great 

Emperor Ashoka The Great, having converted to Buddhism after being victorious in brutal wars, devoted himself to the spread of Buddha's teachings and erected monolithic columns known as Pillars of Ashoka at sites associated with the life of Gautama Buddha.
One such pillar was erected by Ashoka in Lumbini in 249 BC, commemorating the sacred site of Gautama Buddha's birth and declared the village free of taxation.  

In dedication to the two Buddhas of the past, Ashoka also set up a stone pillar and enlarged the stupa marking the birthplace of Buddha Kanakamuni at Nigali Sagar in Kapilvastu District. Another pillar, also in Kapilvastu District, was erected commemorating Kakusandha Buddha.

Medieval Period 
During the medieval period after the 11th century, Khasa Kingdom dominated much of western Nepal and western Tibet which was initially oriented towards Buddhism and Shamanism, and at their peak encompassed Guge and Purang of Tibet and western Nepal up to Kaskikot. King Ripumalla, one of the initial Khasa rulers, left an inscription on the Ashoka pillar with six-syllable mantra of Buddhism and his wish "Om mani padme hum: May Prince Ripu Malla be long victorious", dated around 1312 CE. 

After the late 13th century, Khasa kingdom disintegrated into numerous principalities each with its own ruler. In the 18th century, King Prithvi Narayan Shah, born from the marriage of king Nara Bhupal Shah of the Gorkha Kingdom and Queen Kaushalyavati Devi, the princess of the Palpa kingdom; set out on a conquest to unify the region into modern Nepal.

Modern history

Anglo-Nepalese War

The Anglo-Nepalese War (1814–1816) took place between the Gorkhali army of the Kingdom of Nepal and the British forces of the East India Company for two years leading to the Sugauli Treaty in 1816 which demarcated the boundary of the Kingdom of Nepal. Among the prominent battles during the Anglo-Nepalese War, the Battle of Jitgadhi - fought on January of 1815 and again on the April of 1815 - was marked by the victory of the Gorkhali army. The Nepalese Colonel Ujir Singh Thapa, who led the kingdom of Nepal to victory in this battle, is revered as one of the national heroes in the military history of Nepal. 

Battle of Jit Gadhi 

After the Kingdom of Nepal outright refused the proposal of British East India Company which wanted to claim its sovereignty in the territories of Butwal and Sheoraj, General John Sullivan Wood of the East India Company led an offensive column to the fort of Jit Gadhi on January 1815 AD. The frontier fort, which was surrounded by dense forest and situated on the west bank of the river Tinau on a primary route to Tansen, was being held by Nepalese Colonel Ujir Singh Thapa - the nephew of Nepalese Prime Minister Mukhtiyar Bhimsen Thapa.  

Although low in number and acutely inferior in firepower, the strong resistance put forward by Colonel Ujir Singh Thapa thwarted the incursion of the British forces into Nepal twice on January, 1815 and April, 1815. The battle established Colonel Thapa as a national military hero and forced the English troops to withdraw.

Historical Districts

During the Rana regime, the region was politically divided into administrative districts Butwal, Palpa, Deukhuri, Sallyana, Banke, Bardiya and Pyuthan.

Geography 
Lumbini, with an area of 22,288 square kilometers (8,605.44 sq. mi) covers about 15.1% of the country's total area. Lumbini Province is almost the size of US state of New Jersey. The province extends 150 km (93 mi) north to south and about 300 km (186 mi) east to west at its maximum width. It shares 413.14 km (256 mi) of border with India (states of Bihar and Uttar Pradesh).

The Province is geographically bordered with Gandaki Province to the east and north, by Karnali province to the north and west, by Sudurpaschim Province to the west and by India to the south. There are three ecological regions of Mountains, Hills and Terai; each occupying 3.1%, 69.3% and 27.6% of the province respectively.

Climate 
Lumbini has a humid subtropical climate and experiences four seasons. The winter in January and February is followed by summer between March and May and the monsoon season between June and September. In winter, it's sunny and mild, pleasantly warm during the day but cool at night, sometimes even cold. The average temperature in January is around 15 °C (59 °F). But the northern parts of the province get colder and can experience snowfall. By March, the temperature rises considerably and it begins to be hot, while from April to June it's scorching hot, and highs can reach or exceed 40 °C (104 °F) in southern plains.

In June, the summer monsoon arrives, characterized by heavy rains, in the form of downpours and thunderstorms. The monsoon arrives first in the east, in early June, while in the west it comes in the middle of the month or so. The temperature decreases, with the maximum dropping to around 32 °C (90 °F) in July and August, but the humidity increases, making the heat muggy. The rains are heavy, especially in July and August, when they exceed 300 millimeters (12 inches) per month, but in certain areas at the foot of the mountains, they can exceed 600 mm (23.5 in) per month. The monsoon starts to withdraw by early October in the west, and about a week later in the east. The weather returns to be sunny, and even though October is still a hot month, the humidity decreases, and the night temperature becomes a bit cooler.

Valleys

Dang-Deukhuri 
Dang and Deukhuri valleys, 10 km apart, are located in the Dang Deukhuri District. The Dang Valley lies between the Mahabharat Range in the north and the Churia Range in the south. It forms a nearly 1,000 km2 (390 sq mi) plain within a local drainage basin of less than 3,000 km2 (1,200 sq mi). It is drained by the Babai River, and is one of the largest Inner Terai valleys. Deukhuri Valley is southeast of the Dang Valley and extends about 60 km (37 mi) in WNW-ESE direction with a maximum width of 20 km (12 mi), and is surrounded by Sivalik Hills on all sides. It forms a nearly 600 km2 (230 sq mi) plain within a drainage basin of 6,100 km2 (2,400 sq mi). The valley is drained by the West Rapti River.

The elevations of Dang and Deukhuri valleys are 700 meters and 300 meters from sea level respectively. Late Cenozoic sedimentary sequences are well exposed along the southern part of Dang and all sides of Deukhuri valley, and mostly consist of deformed rocks resulting from the persistence of shortening between Indian Plate and Eurasian Plate. The two valleys have been considered a vital location of Paleolithic archeology in South Asia due to the abundant presence of ancient Paleolithic tool sites.

Other small valleys of the province are located in districts like Arghakhanchi (Rapti), Palpa (Rampur), Gulmi (Simaltari), Pyuthan (Darban and Bajipur).

Forests 

About 15% of the total land is covered in protected forest in the province.

Mountains
Being the only mountain district of Lumbini province, most of the prominent peaks of the province lie in Eastern Rukum District along the Dhaulagiri range. The tallest mountain of Lumbini Province in Eastern Rukum, Putha Himchuli also known as Mount Dhaulagiri VII, has an altitude of 7,246 meters and is one of the popular trekking peak of the Dhaulagiri region. The mountain was first ascended jointly by British explorer J.O.M Roberts and Nepalese climber Ang Nyima Sherpa in 1954. Mount Sisne I remained an unclimbed summit until 2013, and the first successful ascent was made by a mountaineering team led by Man Bahadur Khatri.

Protected areas 
 Bardiya National Park
 Banke National Park
 Dhorpatan Hunting Reserve

Demographics 
In 2011 Lumbini had a census population of 4,499,272 with 885,203 households.

Ethnicity 
The province is very ethnically diverse. The largest group is the Tharu with 15.14% of the population. The second largest is Magar with 15.01%. Other Janajati communities include Newar 1.35% Other Janjati 2.72%. The  Khas and Arya communities are Khas/ Chhetri (13.60%), Hill Brahmin (12.37%), Kami (6%), Damai (1.88%), Sarki (1.48%), Thakuri (1.33%) and Sanyasi (1.15%). The Terai communities are Musalman (6.93%), Yadav (4.03%), Chamar (2.04%), Kewat (1.04%), Kahar (1.02%) and Paswan (1.01%).

Religion 
The majority of population in the province practices Hinduism, followed by Islam, Buddhism and Christianity. Among these, almost 90% of the people identify themselves as Hindus and 7% identify themselves as Muslims, 3% as Buddhists and 1% as Christians. Often cited as an example of social harmony, the majority population of Hindus and Muslims of Lumbini and the surrounding villages have safeguarded and promoted the Buddhist heritage sites together in unison.

Language 

Nepali is the most spoken language of the province, but is also a home to Tharu community and 'Tharu language' with 600,000 speakers. The province also has many speakers of Bhojpuri, Awadhi, Urdu and Magar languages.

The Language Commission of Nepal has recommended Tharu and Awadhi as official language in the province. The commission has also recommended Bhojpuri, Urdu, Magar and Maithili to be additional official languages, for specific regions and purposes in the province.

Administrative subdivisions 
 There is a total of 109 local administrative units in the province which include four sub-metropolitan cities, 32 urban municipalities, and 73 rural municipalities.

Districts 

Districts in Nepal are the second level of administrative divisions after provinces. Lumbini Province is divided into 12 districts, which are listed below. A district is administrated by the head of the District Coordination Committee and the District Administration Officer. The districts are further divided into municipalities or rural municipalities.

After the state's reconstruction of administrative divisions, Nawalparasi District and Rukum District were divided into Parasi District and Nawalpur District, and Eastern Rukum District and Western Rukum District respectively.

Municipality 
Cities and villages are governed by municipalities in Nepal. A district may have one or more municipalities. Lumbini has two types of municipalities.
 Urban Municipality 
 Metropolitan city (Mahanagarpalika)
 Sub-metropolitan city (Upa-mahanagarpalika) and
 Municipality (Nagarpalika)
 Rural Municipality (Gaunpalika)

The government of Nepal has set out a minimum criteria to meet city and towns. These criteria include a certain population, infrastructure and revenues.

Government 

The Governor acts as the head of the province, while the Chief Minister is the head of the provincial government. The Chief Judge of the Tulsipur High Court is the head of the judiciary. The Speaker of the Assembly is Purna Bahadur Gharti. Umakanta Jha is the first Governor of Lumbini Province. Current Governor Dharma Nath Yadav was appointed on 4 November 2019 by the President of Nepal.

Provincial Assembly 
Lumbini provincial assembly is the unicameral legislative assembly consisting of 87 members. Candidates for each constituency are chosen by the political parties or stand as independents. Each constituency elects one member under the first past the post (FPTP) system of election. The current constitution specifies that sixty percent of the members should be elected from the first past the post system and forty percent through the party-list proportional representation (PR) system. Women should account for one-third of total members elected from each party. If one-third percentage are not elected, the party that fails to ensure so shall have to elect one-third of the total number as women through the party-list proportional representation.

Economy 

As of 2021, Lumbini Province is the 2nd fastest growing province in Nepal after Bagmati Province and is third out of the seven provinces in terms of its contribution to the GDP (14% as of 2021). The two major custom points of Nepal, Nepalganj and Siddharthanagar (Bhairahawa) are situated in the south of the province, and are major transit zones of trade and transport through India. The rapidly expanding cities in Lumbini province, Butwal and Siddharthanagar in Rupandehi District, Ghorahi and Tulsipur in Dang District, and Nepalgunj and Kohalpur in Banke District are major industrial centers.

Ranking 2nd in the number of banks and financial institutions in Nepal after Bagmati Province; several projects have been launched in the province to boost economic growth. Construction of the Gautam Buddha International Airport, upgrade of the Nepalgunj Airport into an international airport as per the 20-years master plan, establishment of industrial units in Special economic zone, and the opening of new hotels are expected to spur further economic growth in the province. The national pride projects which have been initiated in the province include:

Agriculture 
The province has both temperate and tropical climates and is diverse in terms of agriculture crop production potentialities. The province is best suited for agriculture production with five core terai districts, one inner terai, and 6 other hill districts. The land is very fertile and a good source of irrigation prevails. Sikta Irrigation Project and Babai Diversion and Irrigation project have benefited the agricultural production.  The major crops are paddy, mustard, wheat, maize, sugarcane, vegetables, potato, lentils and cotton. Lumbini is self-sufficient in milk, cereal crops and pulses.

Industry 
By 2021, there were 16,549 registered companies in the province. Lumbini province ranks 2nd in the country after Bagmati Province in the share of small, cottage and micro-level industries numbering 81,164 that create an estimated 493,686 employment. In addition, tourism industry is a massively growing industry in Lumbini province, welcoming the largest numbers of tourists in Nepal from about 113 countries worldwide.

Two of the prime industrial estates of Nepal in Lumbini Province - Nepalgunj industrial estate (district), the oldest industrial estate of the province, was established in 1973 AD and Butwal industrial estate was established in 1975 AD. Combined, the two industrial estates have about a hundred industries in the zone and are a significant source of revenue of the country. Post-promulgation of the  Constitution of Nepal in 2015, further industrial estates were declared in the province by the Council of Ministers of the Government of Nepal: Motipur industrial estate in Rupandehi and Naubasta industrial estate in Banke districts. Similarly, Dang industrial estate has been declared in Dang district.

Tourism

Lumbini 
Lumbini, considered one of the holiest place in Buddhism associated with the Buddha's birth, is a World Heritage Site and the most visited place in Nepal with 1.5 million tourist arriving annually. Lumbini has a number of older temples, including the Mayadevi Temple, and various new temples, funded by Buddhist organizations from various countries, have been completed or are still under construction. The ancient ruins of complex structures have been conserved in the area including the Shakya tank – the remains within the Mayadevi Temple with brick structures and cross-wall system that have been dated from 3rd century BC, Ashoka pillar, excavated remains of Buddhist monasteries of 3rd century BC to the 5th century AD and the remains of Buddhist stupas  (memorial shrines) dated between 3rd century BC to the 15th century AD.  In addition to the ruins of ancient monasteries, there is a sacred Bodhi tree, an ancient bathing pond, the Ashokan pillar and the Mayadevi Temple, a site traditionally considered to be the birthplace of the Buddha. 
 

Lumbini complex is divided into three areas: Sacred garden, Monastic zone, Cultural center and new Lumbini village. The sacred garden is the epicenter of the complex which is centered around the birthplace of Buddha and consists of the Mayadevi Temple, the Asoka Pillar, the Marker Stone, the Nativity Sculpture, Sacred Pond (Puskarini), and many structural ruins including Buddhist Viharas & Stupas. The monastic zone is divided into east and west each reflecting two different schools of Buddhism. As a centre of pilgrimage, many countries have established their monasteries in the complex reflecting their own cultural design and spirituality. In the large monastic zone only monasteries can be built; no shops, hotels or restaurants are allowed. The zone is divided into an eastern and western monastic zone, the eastern having the Theravadin monasteries, the western having the Mahayana and Vajrayana monasteries. The Cultural Center consists of museums, Lumbini International Research Institute (LIRI), administration complex etc. and the New Lumbini Village has the World Peace Pagoda and the Lumbini Crane Sanctuary. World Peace Pagoda lies at the northern end of the Lumbini complex and was designed by Japanese buddhists to represent universal peace.

Kapilvastu 
Widely attributed as the hometown of Gautama Buddha, the Kapilvastu District of present-day Nepal has more than 130 archaeological sites, primarily concentrated in Tilaurakot, Kudan, Gotihawa, Niglihawa, Araurakot, Sagarhawa and Sisaniya. The region is also considered the hometown of two previous Buddhas before Gautama: Kakusandha Buddha who was born in Gotihawa and Koṇāgamana Buddha who was born in Niglihawa. Among three Ashoka pillars in Nepal, two are situated in Gotihawa and Niglihawa erected during King Ashoka's visit to ancient Kapilvastu. Tilaurakot, considered the cardinal point of the ancient Shakyan city of Kapilavastu where Gautama Buddha spent 29 years of his lifetime, was added to the World Heritage Tentative List by UNESCO on 1996.

Ramagrama 
After the death of Gautama Buddha, his relics were divided among eight princes out of sixteen mahājanapadās.
A Koliyan king of Rāmagrāma (present Parasi district), built a stupa enshrining one relic.
Known as the only undisturbed original relic of Buddha in the world, the site of stupa was added to the World Heritage Tentative List by UNESCO on 23 May 1996.

Dhaulagiri circuit 
The Dhaulagiri circuit in Eastern Rukum encompasses the Dhaulagiri mountain range of the northern Lumbini Province. The Dhaulagiri mountain range extends from the northwest to the northeast of Eastern Rukum district and then continues eastward to its tallest peak at Dhaulagiri I. Putha Hiunchuli (Dhaulagiri VII), one of the most popular 7,000-metre mountains, was first climbed by British explorer J. O. M. Roberts and Sherpa Ang Nyima in 1954.  
The West Dhaulagiri circuit is a tourist trekking circuit close to the Dhaulagiri mountain range and Magar-majority villages, with a distinct preserved Kham Magar culture of the northern Lumbini province.The circuit's eastern portion is situated along the Dhorpatan reserve of Eastern Rukum, which was designated to preserve high-altitude ecosystems in western Nepal in 1983. The reserve harbours alpine, sub-alpine and high temperate vegetation and 137 species of birds. Endangered animals in the reserve include the musk deer, wolf, red panda, cheer pheasant and danphe.

National Parks 
Bardiya National Park is the largest national park in the lowland Terai, covering 968 square kilometres.
It was established in 1976 to protect the representative ecosystem, habitats of tigers and their prey species.
As a beautiful, unspoiled wilderness of sal forest, grassland, and alluvial washes cut by the many fingers of the Karnali River, it is a popular tourist destination, offering elephant rides and wilderness sight-seeing of Gangetic dolphins, tigers, rhinos and elephants.

In 1997, a buffer zone of 327 square kilometres surrounding the park was declared, consisting of forests and private lands.
The buffer zone is jointly managed by the local communities and the park and community development and resource management is carried out jointly.

The Babai valley, which is rich in biodiversity, was added to the park in 1984.
The zone has wooded grassland and riverine forest and its water is home to Gharial crocodile.
More than 30 different mammals, 513 species of birds and several species of snakes, lizard and fishes have been recorded in the park area.

Banke National Park, adjacent to the Bardiya National Park with the coherent protected area of 1,518 km2 (586 sq mi), represents the Tiger Conservation Unit (TCU).
The national park was established in 2010 and is a protected area of tiger and four-horned antelopes.
The park extends over 550 square kilometers in Banke district of the province.
Banke National Park is connected with Bardiya National Park in the west and wildlife sanctuary and forests of India in the south.
The protected zone is an important component of Terai Arc Landscape (TAL) that provides habitat for tigers.
The park has eight ecosystem types: Sal forest, deciduous Riverine forest, savannahs and grasslands, mixed hardwood forest, flood plain community, Bhabar and foothills of Chure range.
It is home to 124 plants, 34 mammals, more than 300 birds, 24 reptiles, 7 amphibians and 58 fish species.
Under the National Parks and Wildlife Conservation Act 1973, 3 species of mammals (tiger, striped hyaena, four-horned antelope), 4 species of birds (giant hornbill, black stork, Bengal florican, and lesser florican) and 2 species of reptiles (gharial crocodile and python) are protected in the park.

Rani Mahal 

Rani Mahal ("Queen's Palace") was constructed in 1893 by General Khadga Shumsher to commemorate his late wife Tej Kumari Devi.
The palace is at the banks of the Kali Gandaki River, between Syangja and Palpa, eighteen kilometres from Tansen.

Pandaveshwor Temple 
A temple dedicated to Shiva is situated at the base of chure range, south of Babai river about 9 kilometers from the center of Ghorahi in Dang district. As per the belief, the temple marks the ancient site of Mahābhārata where the five Pandavas brother prayed to Shiva during their journey to the Himalayas. The temple complex consists of the world's largest Trishula. The temple has become an important site for Hindu devotees as well as for prominent personalities such as the President of Nepal, police chiefs, chief justices and ministers.

Some popular religious and tourist centres are:
 Swargadwari
 Jitgadi Fort
 Bageshwori Temple
 Bhairabsthan
 Resunga
 Ridi
 Ambikeshwori
 Supa Deurali
Popular lakes 
 Satyawati
 Bahrakune
 Jagadishpur
 Rukmini
 Jakhera

Infrastructure

Education 
By 2014, Palpa District was one of the first 4 "fully literate" districts of Nepal, achieving a literacy rate of over 95%. By 2018, further districts of Lumbini province namely, Arghakhanchi, Gulmi, Pyuthan, Dang, Parasi, Rupandehi, Rolpa, Bardiya and Eastern Rukum District were classified as fully literate districts of Nepal.

Universities
 Nepal Sanskrit University
 Rapti Academy of Health Sciences
 Lumbini Bauddha University

Health 

According to the National Demographic Health Survey (NDHS) 2016, the Province's Neonatal Mortality (per 1000 live births) stands at 30 and Infant mortality rate (per 1000 live births) stands at 42, both of which are higher than the national average of 21 and 32 respectively. The province has 670 public health facilities, including four hub hospitals, 18 hospitals, two regional medical stores, 31 primary health care centers, 570 health posts, 27 urban health centers, 15 community health units and 9 other health facilities.

Communication 
In Lumbini province, 49.2% of the population have radio access and followed by 30.4% have access to TV, and only 1.3% have access to the internet. Similarly, 4.4% of the population have access to landline telephone, while 65.8% have access to mobile phone. There are three major cell phone providers in Lumbini Province. They are Nepal Doorsanchar Company Limited (NTC), Ncell Axiata Limited (NCELL) and Smart Cell. The coverage of Smart Cell providers is only in 5 districts.

There are 66 newspaper channels in Lumbini Province with national, provincial, and local outreach. As per the classification, some of the top-ranking newspapers are Gorachya Dainik, Dainik Nepalgunj, and Mechikali Sandesh Dainik. There are a total of 63 radio stations in the province, such as Radio Lumbini, Radio Tulsipur, Bheri F.M., etc.

Energy 

91% of the population has access to electricity in the province. Of the 12 districts in Lumbini Province, Parasi, Kapilvastu and Bardiya have been electrified by more than 99 percent. Gulmi, Arghakhanchi and Rupandehi have more than 95 percent electrification and Rukum East has the lowest electrification of 11.25 percent. Lumbini generates 21.2 MW of electricity from hydropower. Total number of electricity consumers in the province is 457992, consuming 370.8 Million MWh of energy annually. According to NEA, Distribution and Consumer Service Directorate 93% of consumers are domestic users; loss of electricity in the province is 12.17% for the year 2076/77 (2020 AD). Out of the total loss in distribution provincial office, Gularia contributes the highest loss percentage of 25.02%.

Butwal Solar PV Project, Nepal's first private grid-connected solar power plant, was connected to national transmission line in October 2020. Ridi Hydropower Company has constructed the power plant in Tilottama of Rupendehi District. With over 32,000 solar panels of 330 watts each, the plant can generate 8.5 MW of electricity.

Transportation

Roadways 
Transportation routes in Lumbini evolved since  H01. Lumbini has two major routes,  H01 and  H10 both intersecting in Butwal. 8,931 km of road is constructed in the Province. Out of which 5,293 km is blacktopped.

All 12 districts of the province are connected via blacktopped roads. Major highways of the province are as follows:

 Mahendra Highway: Mahendra Highway( H01) traverses districts of Bardiya, Banke, Dang, Kapilvastu, Rupandehi, Parasi latitudinally. It connects to Bagmati to east and Sudurpaschim to the west.
 Ratna Highway: Ratna Highway ( H12)  to Karnali Province. It starts at Nepal- India border in Nepalgunj and terminates at Birendranagar, Surkhet. The highway transition into the Karnali Highway system from the point it terminates.
 Rapti Highway: Rapti Highway ( H11) starts from Ameliya, Dang and terminates at Musikot West Rukum. This highway makes hilly regions of Rolpa, Salyan West Rukum and east Rukum accessible.
 Siddhartha Highway: Siddhartha Highway( H10) highway starts at Nepal-India Border in Siddharthanagar and terminates at Prithivi chowk, Pokhara. The major settlements on the highway are Siddharthanagar, Butwal, Tansen, Waling, Putalibazar, Syangja and Pokhara.

Bhairahawa and Nepalgunj have always been major trade routes with India. Lumbini has no railways but East West railway, Kathmandu-Lumbini railway and several other routes connecting Indian cities are planned.

Air Travel 
Gautam Buddha International Airport, Nepalgunj Airport and Dang Airport are major airstrips in the province. Nepalgunj Airport, Nepal's second most busiest airport after Tribhuwan International Airport, is being upgraded to an international airport as per the 20 year master plan. Being mostly flat land air travel isn't preferable but Nepalgunj Airport serves as hub for most of the airports in Karnali Province and Sudurpaschim Province and is a transit point for tourists heading to Lake Manasarovar and Mount Kailash in Tibet. New airports are under construction in Resunga (Gulmi District) and Sandhikharka (Arghakhanchi District).

See also
List of Provinces of Nepal
List of districts of Nepal
List of mayors of municipalities in Nepal
List of districts of Lumbini Province

References

 Lumbini Pradesh
2015 establishments in Nepal
Provinces of Nepal
States and territories established in 2015